The Massad family (also written Massaad or Mas'ad), is an Arab Eastern Orthodox Christian family. Originally from Jdeideh Marjayoun, Lebanon, the family emigrated to South America and to the United States (especially to Oklahoma) during the late 19th and early 20th centuries due to the rising oppression of Christians in the Muslim Turkish Ottoman Empire.

Notable people

 Paul Peter Massad (1806–1890), Maronite Christian Patriarch of Antioch
 Timothy Massad (b. 1956), Lawyer and US Treasury Department official

See also
 
Antiochian Greek Christians	
Arab Christians
Christianity in Lebanon
Greek genocide
Greek Orthodox (Roum Orthodox) Christians in Lebanon
History of Arab Christians
History of Eastern Christianity
History of the Eastern Orthodox Church under the Ottoman Empire
Lebanese Americans
Persecution of Eastern Orthodox Christians

References

External links
 Christian Lebanese immigration to Oklahoma, Oklahoma Historical Society.

Arabic-language surnames
Christian families